"Allá en el Rancho Grande" is a Mexican song. It was written in the 1920s for a musical theatrical work, but now is most commonly associated with the eponymous 1936 Mexican motion picture Allá en el Rancho Grande, in which it was sung by renowned actor and singer Tito Guízar and with mariachis.

Bing Crosby recorded the song on April 3, 1939 as "El Rancho Grande" and it reached the No. 6 spot in the charts during a ten-week stay in 1939. Crosby recorded the song again in 1954 for the album Bing: A Musical Autobiography.

The song was featured in the film Mexicali Rose (1939) starring Gene Autry. Autry also made a commercial recording of the song.

Others to record the song are Al Bowlly (as "Give Me My Ranch"), Artie Shaw, Dave Brubeck (on his Bravo! Brubeck! album) and Dean Martin (on his Dino Latino album).

In 1958 the song was covered by Rex Allen on his album Mister Cowboy on the Decca record label.

Elvis Presley sang the song when playing around at the rehearsals for the documentary film That's the Way It Is (on Wednesday, July 15, 1970). His performance was recorded and, in 1995, released by BMG on the box set Walk a Mile in My Shoes: The Essential '70s Masters.

Musical style 
The song is a typical ranchera, with mariachi choruses and lyrics dealing with life in a traditional Mexican ranch. The American arrangement of the song was copyrighted as a "rumba", a term largely used in the US to denote Americanized Afro-Cuban and Latin ballroom music According to the book The Course of Mexican Music,

Track listing of Presley CD 
Elvis La Canta A Mexico "Allá En El Rancho Grande"  (promo CD, 1998, BMG Entertainment Mexico, S.A. De C.V.)
 "Allá en el Rancho Grande"
 "Guadalajara"	
 "México"

References 

Works cited

External links 
 Elvis Presley – Elvis La Canta A Mexico "Allá En El Rancho Grande" at Discogs

Ranchera songs
1920s songs
Elvis Presley songs
Al Bowlly songs